Paigham-i-Pakistan or  Paigham-e-Pakistan is a fatwa sought by the Government of Pakistan to counter terrorism. Ulama unanimously declared terrorism, suicide attacks, and killing someone, haram in Islam. The fatwa was prepared by  International Islamic University and signed by 1,800 scholars from various  Islamic schools of thought.

References 
6.Paigham e Pakistan Charter.Government College Women University, Sailkot, Pakistan.

External links 
 Download English text

Counterterrorism in Pakistan
Fatwas
Government of Pakistan
2018 in Pakistan
2018 documents